Mulin Town is one of the 19 towns of Shunyi District, Beijing. It borders Henanzhai Town to its north, Dongshaoqu and Longwantun Towns to its east, Yang and Beixiaoying Towns to its south, and Yangsong Town in its west. It had 34,114 inhabitants under its administration as of 2020.

The town took its name Mulin from the forest on the west of the settlement during the reign of Wanli Emperor of Ming dynasty.

History

Administrative divisions 
As of 2021, Mulin Town oversaw 26 villages:

See also 

 List of township-level divisions of Beijing

References 

Towns in Beijing
Shunyi District